The 2011–12 Egyptian Premier League was the fifty-fifth season of the Egyptian Premier League since its establishment in 1948. The season began on 14 October 2011, with a total of 19 teams contesting the league.  Al Ahly won the last seven league titles.

This season, the league increased from 16 to 19 teams due to no relegation in the 2010–11 season as a result of the 2011 Egyptian revolution.  Three teams were promoted from the second division.

Following the Port Said Stadium disaster on 1 February 2012, the season was suspended. At that time, teams had played between 14 and 17 games out of 30. Haras El-Hodood was in first place with a 12–1–1 record.  This result was considered a significant surprise by Al Ahram. On 10 March 2012, a decision was reached to cancel the remainder of the season.

Teams 
Al Ittihad Al Sakandary, Smouha and Al Mokawloon Al Arab were the worst three teams in 2010–11 but were not relegated to the 2011–12 Egyptian Second Division.  Three teams were promoted from the 2010–11 Egyptian Second Division – El Dakhleya, Ghazl El Mahalla, and Telephonat Bani Sweif – bringing the league up to 19 teams total.

Stadiums and locations 

}

Personnel and kits

League table

Results

Season statistics

Top goalscorers

Own goals

Hat-tricks

Scoring
First goal of the season: Hosni Abd Rabo for Ismaily against Petrojet (14 October 2011)
Fastest goal of the season: 38 seconds – Ashour El Takky for Wadi Degla against Telephonat Bani Sweif (19 October 2011)
Widest winning margin: 5 goals
Zamalek 6–1 Ghazl El Mahalla (19 October 2011)
Highest scoring game: 7 goals
Zamalek 6–1 Ghazl El Mahalla (19 October 2011)
Misr El Makasa 5–2 Al Ittihad Al Sakandary (3 November 2011)
Most goals scored in a match by a single team: 6 goals
Zamalek 6–1 Ghazl El Mahalla (19 October 2011)
Most goals scored in a match by a losing team: 2 goals
Misr El Makasa 2–3 Petrojet (23 October 2011)
Enppi 3–2 El Dakhleya (24 October 2011)
Misr El Makasa 5–2 Al Ittihad Al Sakandary (3 November 2011)
Enppi 2–3 Al Ahly (7 November 2011)
Al Mokawloon Al Arab 2–3 Haras El Hodood (22 December 2011)
Most goals scored in a match by a single player:  3 goals
Oussou Konan for Misr El Makasa against Al Ittihad Al Sakandary (3 November 2011)

Clean sheets
Most clean sheets: 5
Al Ittihad Al Sakandary
Fewest clean sheets: 0
Enppi
Tala'ea El Gaish

Cancellation
On 10 March 2012, a decision was reached to cancel the remainder of the season. A spokesperson for the Egyptian Football Association said the decision was made because there was insufficient time to play the remaining games before the national team was scheduled to compete in the 2012 Olympics and qualifiers for the 2013 Africa Cup of Nations. Farouk Ga’afar, coach of El-Gaish strongly criticized the decision saying the decision would cost the country a lot of money and that "people sitting in coffee shops could make a better decision." It was the fifth time that Egypt has cancelled a season of football; previously 1954–55, 1970–71, 1973–74, and 1989–90 were cancelled for a variety of reasons.

At the same time, it was announced that 18 teams would compete in a friendly tournament "Martyrs Cup" to raise money for families of those killed in Port Said incident. Al Masry, the home team whose fans rioted in Port Said, leaving 74 people dead and 150 injured, was barred from the tournament. Al Ahly, the visiting team during the attack, has been invited but has not confirmed whether they will participate or not. The tournament is scheduled to commence on 29 March with round robin play.  The league will be divided into two groups, and the games will take place in empty stadiums owned by the Egyptian Army. The top two teams from each group will advance to the semi-finals for a single elimination event. The final is scheduled for 18 May. The Egypt Cup is expected to take place as normal, with Al Masry barred from competition.

Under normal circumstances, the league's top two teams get to participate in the African Champions League. It was not immediately clear if league leaders El-Hodood and Al-Ahly would be declared as the league's top two teams and invited to participate in the Champions League.  "I am not against the league cancellation but I want to know: Will we be considered as the league champions?" asked El-Hodoud coach Tarek El-Ashry.
In the end, Al-Ahly and Zamalek, who were the 2010-11 League Champions and runners-up, were selected to represent Egypt.  Al-Ahly went on to win the tournament.

References

External links

Season at soccerway.com
RSSSF

1
1
Egyptian Premier League
Cancelled association football competitions